The Church of Holy Trinity in the Knights Street of Rhodes is a Greek Orthodox church in Rhodes, Greece. It is one of the two churches dedicated to Holy Trinity within the old medieval town of Rhodes.

History 
It was built between 1365 and 1374, and was dedicated to Archangel Michael, but later it was dedicated to the Holy Trinity.

The Church of Archangel Michael was built by the Knights Hospitaller and was therefore dedicated to the Catholic doctrine.

During the Ottoman Turkish rule on the island, it was converted into a mosque under the name Khan Zade Mescidi. It was converted into an Orthodox church when the Dodecanese islands were annexed by Greece after World War II.

Architecture 
In its original form, the church was single-room building and was probably covered by a single arch.

The coat of arms of the Holy See, framed by the coat of arms of England, can be seen on the eaves of the main entrance, located on Knights Street in the medieval town of Rhodes, in the northeast of the island.

As for the murals that once adorned the interior of the Holy Trinity, only few remain to this day, with intense Italian conservation interventions. In the quadrant of the arch is depicted the rare iconographic theme of the Throne of Grace. The Ancient of Days is represented enthroned holding the crucifix in his hands; it is a western variation of the theme of the Holy Trinity, after which the church was named. This central decoration is flanked by the figures of the Virgin Mary and Saint John the Baptist, while the semi-cylinder is decorated with concelebrating saints.

The wall paintings must have been finished at the end of the 15th or the beginning of the 16th century.

The elliptical dome that covers the monument today was added after its conversion to a mosque.

Gallery

See also 
 Catholic Church in Greece
 Conversion of non-Islamic places of worship into mosques

References

External links 
 

Buildings and structures in Rhodes (city)
Former mosques in Greece
Mosques converted from churches in Ottoman Greece
14th-century architecture in Greece
14th-century churches
Rhodes under the Knights Hospitaller
Eastern Orthodox church buildings in Greece
Gothic architecture in Greece
Medieval sites in Greece
Tourist attractions in the South Aegean
Former Roman Catholic church buildings
Church buildings with domes